Bahramabad in Qazvin Province may refer to:

Bahramabad, Abyek, a village in Abyek County, Qazvin Province, Iran
Bahramabad, Qazvin, a village in Qazvin County, Qazvin Province, Iran
Bahramabad-e Qaqazan, a village in Qazvin County, Qazvin Province, Iran